Victor Hugo Ribeiro Colonese (born January 16, 1992 in Salvador) is a Brazilian swimmer, who specialized in open water marathon.

At the 2011 FINA World Championships in Shanghai, Colonese placed 22nd in the 5 km marathon, with a time of 56:39.7.

At the 2011 Summer Universiade in Shenzhen, he finished 9th in the Men's 10 kilometre marathon.

At the 2015 FINA World Championships in Kazan, he finished 9th in the 5 km marathon.

At the 2017 FINA World Championships in Budapest, he finished 22nd in the 25 km marathon and 39th in the 5 km marathon

At the 2019 Pan American Games held in Lima, Peru, he finished 4th in the Men's marathon 10 kilometres. In July 2020, he inherited the bronze medal, three weeks after the announcement of doping by Argentine Guillermo Bertola, who had been silver in the race.

References

1992 births
Living people
Brazilian male long-distance swimmers
Sportspeople from Salvador, Bahia
Swimmers at the 2019 Pan American Games
Medalists at the 2019 Pan American Games
Pan American Games bronze medalists for Brazil
Pan American Games medalists in swimming
21st-century Brazilian people